Scholtes is a surname. Notable people with the surname include:

Brigitte Scholtes (born 1958), German radio journalist
Peter Scholtes (1938–2009), American Roman Catholic priest and writer
Richard Scholtes, United States Army general
Tessy Scholtes (born 1981), Luxembourgian karateka and politician

See also
Scholtès, a former French company, now a brand of Indesit Company